Garthia is a genus of lizards, commonly known as marked geckos, in the family Phyllodactylidae. The genus is endemic to South America.

Etymology
The generic name, Garthia, is in honor of British herpetologist Garth Underwood.

Species
The following two species are recognized.

Garthia gaudichaudii (A.M.C. Duméril & Bibron, 1836)  – Chilean marked gecko
Garthia gaudichaudii dorbignii (A.M.C. Duméril & Bibron, 1836)
Garthia gaudichaudii gaudichaudii (A.M.C. Duméril & Bibron, 1836)
Garthia gaudichaudii klugei Donoso-Barros, 1970
Garthia penai Donoso-Barros, 1966 – Coquimbo marked gecko

Nota bene: A binomial authority in parentheses indicates that the species was originally described in a genus other than Garthia.

References

Further reading
Donoso-Barros R, Vanzolini PE (1965). "Garthia. El genero Garthia Donoso-Barros & Vanzolini y los geckos gimnodactylides afines ". Noticiario Mensual del Museo Nacional de Historia Natural, Santiago (Chile) 103: 5–8. (Garthia, new genus). (in Spanish).

 
Lizard genera